The Michigan Regulation and Taxation of Marijuana Act, also known as Proposal 1, was an initiative that appeared on the November 2018 ballot to legalize cannabis in the U.S. state of Michigan. The initiative was approved with 56% of the vote.

History
In November 2017, supporters submitted 365,000 signatures to get legal recreational cannabis on the 2018 ballot. The state certified the initiative on April 26.

The Detroit Free Press reported that state Republicans planned to amend and attempt to pass the initiative in the state legislature. The amendment would involve an income tax cut offset by cannabis tax revenue, and regulation by the appointed board in charge of medical cannabis, not by the Department of Licensing and Regulatory Affairs (LARA). If passed by the legislature, it would not appear on the general ballot.

By June 5, the deadline for an "adopt-and-amend" act to go through the legislature expired, and the un-amended initiative would appear on ballots in November.

Bill contents
The Michigan Regulation and Taxation of Marijuana Act, also sometimes referred to as the "RMLA", would legalize the possession of marijuana for those 21 years and older. The Act also contains a number of provisions that would change the state's marijuana and hemp laws, including:
The Act would eliminate the penalties for anyone who possesses, uses, purchases, transports, or processes 2.5 ounces or less of marijuana, or up to 15 grams of marijuana concentrate.  
The Act further expands this limit to possession of no more than 10 ounces of marijuana within a residence.
The Act allows a Michigan resident to cultivate up to 12 plants in their personal residence.
The Act allows municipalities the option to completely prohibit or limit the number of marijuana establishments within its boundaries.
The Act creates an additional commercial marijuana license category called a "microbusiness", which allows an individual to grow up to 150 plants and sell direct to the consumer.
The Act gives LARA the authority to approve or disapprove licenses, as opposed to the medical facility law, which gives that power to a politically appointed licensing board.
The Act imposes a 10% excise tax on the sale of recreational marijuana.

Support
The Coalition to Regulate Marijuana Like Alcohol is the main supporter of the initiative.

Opposition
In February 2018, it was reported that Smart Approaches to Marijuana was funding opposition to the initiative, as they had in other states including California. Two other local groups, Healthy and Productive Michigan and the Committee to Keep Pot Out of Neighborhoods and Schools, were formed in 2017 to oppose the initiative.

Public opinion

See also
Cannabis in Michigan
List of 2018 United States cannabis reform proposals
List of Michigan ballot measures

References

External links
Initiative text from Michigan Secretary of State 
Michigan Marijuana Legalization Initiative (2018) at Ballotpedia

Michigan Proposal 1
Cannabis in Michigan
Michigan Proposal 3
Michigan ballot proposals
Proposal 1